Nathaniel Andrew Linhart (born November 14, 1986) is an American professional basketball player who is currently a free agent. He played college basketball for the University of Akron before playing professionally in Austria, Germany, Italy, Israel, Spain and Belgium.

College career
After playing high school basketball at Lincoln , in Gahanna, Ohio, Linhart played 4 seasons of college basketball at the University of Akron, with the Akron Zips.

Professional career
Linhart went undrafted in the 2009 NBA draft. For the 2009–10 season he signed with BSC Raiffeisen Panthers Fürstenfeld of Austria.

For the 2010–11 season he signed with Erie BayHawks of the NBA D-League. From 2011 to 2013 he played with TBB Trier of the German Basketball Bundesliga. In July 2013, he signed with Reyer Venezia Mestre of the Italian Lega Basket Serie A.
 
In August 2014, Linhart signed a three-year deal with the Israeli powerhouse Maccabi Tel Aviv. He also competed in the EuroLeague with Maccabi, averaging 5.8 points per contest. On July 4, 2015, he left Maccabi and signed a one-year deal with CAI Zaragoza of Spain.

On July 4, 2016, Linhart signed with Medi Bayreuth for the 2016–17 season.

On July 31, 2018, Linhart was announced by Spirou Basket of the Belgian Pro Basketball League (PBL). In early February 2019, he moved back to Germany, signing with the Telekom Baskets Bonn.

On August 29, 2019, Linhart signed with Hapoel Be'er Sheva of the Israeli Premier League. On October 6, 2019, he parted ways with Be'er Sheva after appearing in one pre-season tournament game.

On October 20, 2019, Linhart returned to Medi Bayreuth for a second stint, signing for the 2019–20 season.

Career statistics

Euroleague

|-
| style="text-align:left;"| 2014–15
| style="text-align:left;"| Maccabi
| 20 || 2 || 15.7 || .524 || .432 || .533 || 2.8 || 1.1 || .9 || .3 || 5.8 || 6.5
|- class="sortbottom"
| style="text-align:left;"| Career
| style="text-align:left;"|
| 20 || 2 || 15.7 || .524 || .432 || .533 || 2.8 || 1.1 || .9 || .3 || 5.8 || 6.5

References

External links
 Nate Linhart at eurobasket.com
 Nate Linhart at euroleague.net
 Nate Linhart at fiba.com
 Nate Linhart at realgm.com

1986 births
Living people
Akron Zips men's basketball players
American expatriate basketball people in Austria
American expatriate basketball people in Belgium
American expatriate basketball people in Germany
American expatriate basketball people in Israel
American expatriate basketball people in Italy
American expatriate basketball people in Spain
American men's basketball players
Basket Zaragoza players
Basketball players from Ohio
BSC Fürstenfeld Panthers players
Erie BayHawks (2008–2017) players
Liga ACB players
Maccabi Tel Aviv B.C. players
Medi Bayreuth players
People from Franklin County, Ohio
Reyer Venezia players
Spirou Charleroi players
Telekom Baskets Bonn players
Small forwards